The 1890 New Hampshire gubernatorial election was held on November 4, 1890. Republican nominee Hiram A. Tuttle defeated Democratic nominee Charles H. Amsden with 49.26% of the vote.

General election

Candidates
Major party candidates
Hiram A. Tuttle, Republican
Charles H. Amsden, Democratic

Other candidates
Josiah M. Fletcher, Prohibition

Results

References

1890
New Hampshire
Gubernatorial